Christopher L. Garrett (born December 26, 1973) is a justice of the Oregon Supreme Court since January 1, 2019. Previously, he served on the Oregon Court of Appeals from 2013 to 2019, and was a member of the Oregon House of Representatives from 2008 to 2012.

Early life and career
Garrett was born in Portland and graduated from Wilson High School. He earned a Bachelor of Arts in political science from Reed College in 1996 and a Juris Doctor from the University of Chicago Law School in 2000. He was formerly of counsel with Perkins Coie in Portland. He also teaches courses in legislation and regulation at Willamette College of Law.

Political career
Garrett served as a Senior Policy Advisor to Oregon State Senate President Peter Courtney and also worked in the office of Oregon State Senator Richard Devlin. In 2008, Garrett was the Democratic nominee in House District 38 for the open seat left by Greg Macpherson, who was not seeking re-election. In the general election, Garrett defeated Steve Griffith 62% to 38%. He was re-elected in 2010 and again in 2012.

Oregon Governor John Kitzhaber appointed Garrett to the Oregon Court of Appeals in December 2013, to succeed retiring judge David Schuman. Governor Kate Brown appointed him to the Oregon Supreme Court in December 2018; he succeeded retiring Justice Rives Kistler.

Personal
Garrett lives in Portland.

See also 
 75th Oregon Legislative Assembly

References

External links

 Project VoteSmart biography
 Campaign website
 Perkins Coie LLC profile
 Chris Garrett on Facebook

|-

1973 births
Living people
21st-century American judges
21st-century American politicians
Ida B. Wells-Barnett High School alumni
Justices of the Oregon Supreme Court
Lawyers from Portland, Oregon
Members of the Oregon House of Representatives
Oregon Court of Appeals judges
People associated with Perkins Coie
Politicians from Lake Oswego, Oregon
Reed College alumni
University of Chicago Law School alumni